David Tressel Griggs (6 October 1911 – 31 December 1974) was an American geophysicist. He served as the second Chief Scientist of the U.S. Air Force from 1951 to 1952.

Early life
David Griggs was born in Columbus, Ohio. His father was Robert Fiske Griggs, who discovered the Valley of Ten Thousand Smokes near Mount Katmai in Alaska. The highest area in this area was officially named Mount Griggs in his honor. David accompanied his father on an expedition to that area in 1930.

At age 24, Griggs had an accident while mountain climbing in the Caucasus Mountains, located between the Caspian and Black Seas. He suffered compound fractures in both legs and a dislocated knee; this rendered him physically ineligible for military service during World War II.

Public service
David Griggs helped form the RAND corporation in 1947. As the Air Force chief scientist from 1951 to 1952, he supported development of the thermonuclear (or fusion) bomb, with other scientists such as Edward Teller and Luis Walter Alvarez. During that time, the chairman of the General Advisory Committee, J. Robert Oppenheimer, opposed it, hoping to restrain a predicted worldwide nuclear proliferation. Griggs was one of those whose testimony caused the Personnel Security Board's vote to suspend Oppenheimer's security clearance in 1954, which caused several physicists to consider Griggs as the "Judas who had betrayed their god." 

Griggs accompanied US Army General William Westmoreland through three extended trips to Vietnam in the mid 1960s.

Awards
Griggs was a civilian non-combatant in a tactical mission over northern Italy during World War II. He was hit by a 20-mm shell from an enemy plane. After recovering from the wound, he received a Purple Heart .

For his contributions during the war, President Harry S. Truman presented him a Medal for Merit, the citation reading:

 DR. DAVID GRIGGS, For exceptionally meritorious conduct in the performance of outstanding services as H2X Project Officer in the Eighth Air Force during the period 1 May 1943 to 1 April 1944. Dr. Griggs rendered invaluable service in connection with H2X equipment and instructing personnel to operate this equipment. Through his tireless efforts and outstanding leadership he made a substantial contribution to the heavy bombardment operations performed by the Eighth Air Force. The professional skill and the devotion to duty displayed by Dr. Griggs reflect the highest credit upon himself and the Armed Forces of the United States.

Griggs received the Walter H. Bucher Medal of the American Geophysical Union in 1970.

He received the Arthur L. Day Medal of the Geological Society of America in 1973.

Griggs was awarded two UD Air Force Exceptional Service Awards (1953, 1972).

Death
Griggs suffered a fatal heart attack during a ski trip to Snowmass, Colorado in late 1974. His ashes were buried near those of his parents at a site on Mount Griggs in Alaska. The ashes of his daughter Nicola Andron, who died in childbirth a few months after her father's death, were also buried there.

References

Sources
 
 

1911 births
1974 deaths
United States Air Force civilians
American scientists
Fellows of the American Physical Society